Meena Kanwar is an Indian politician who is an elected member from Shergarh Assembly constituency in Jodhpur district of Rajasthan and is a member of the Congress Party.

Political career
Meena Kanwar contested the 2018 Rajasthan assembly election from Shergarh Assembly constituency in Jodhpur district, where she won by 99,916 votes.

References

Living people
Rajasthan MLAs 2018–2023
1971 births
People from Sikar